Toegyewon Station is a railway station of the Gyeongchun Line in Toegyewon-myeon, Namyangju-si, Gyeonggi-do, South Korea.

Station Layout

Surface connections
Station links bus stop for the following routes:

Railway stations in Gyeonggi Province
Seoul Metropolitan Subway stations
Metro stations in Namyangju
Railway stations opened in 1939